The Venerable William Hodges, D.D. was an Anglican priest in England during the  17th-century.

Hodges was born in Chittlehampton and educated at Exeter College, Oxford. He held livings at Bampton and  Ripple. Hillerson was Archdeacon of Buckingham from 1671 until his death on 1 November 1684.

Notes 

1684 deaths
Alumni of Exeter College, Oxford
Archdeacons of Worcester
Clergy from Devon
17th-century English Anglican priests
People from North Devon (district)